Vilson Lila (born 6 October 1989) is an Albanian professional footballer who plays as a centre-back for Kosovar club Gjilani.

Club career
On 7 January 2019, Lila joined Kosovar club Gjilani. Ahead of the following 2019-20 season, he moved to Liria Prizren.

References

1989 births
Living people
People from Bulqizë
Albanian footballers
Association football central defenders
KS Kastrioti players
KF Skrapari players
KF Adriatiku Mamurrasi players
FK Kukësi players
KF Tërbuni Pukë players
SC Gjilani players
KF Liria players
Kategoria e Parë players
Kategoria Superiore players
Football Superleague of Kosovo players
Albanian expatriate footballers
Expatriate footballers in Kosovo
Albanian expatriate sportspeople in Kosovo